is a short story by Japanese writer Ichiyō Higuchi first published in 1895. It follows Oseki Harada, a woman married to an abusive husband, who pays her parents a nightly visit to ask for their assent to a divorce.

Plot
On the thirteenth night of the ninth month of the year, Oseki Harada stands outside her parents' lower-class house, overhearing her father telling her mother how lucky they are that they have such good children. Oseki has secretly left her upper-class husband Isamu Harada's house, leaving her young son Taro behind, intent on divorcing her husband and asking her parents for their assent. Her father asks her in upon noticing her, with both parents expressing their gratitude towards Oseki's husband, who enabled a higher education for her younger brother Inosuke. They also ask her forgiveness for not visiting her in her home. 

Oseki, reluctant and polite at first, eventually bursts into tears when she tells her parents of her unhappy marriage with Isamu, who treats her cruelly, always picking on her for her low education, and even humiliating her in front of the servants. She asks her parents to take her back, promising that she will take up any kind of work and support her brother. Oseki's mother takes the side of her daughter, outraged by Isamu's behaviour, reminding those present that it was Isamu who had asked for her hand against the parents' advice, and how they insisted that Oseki was no match for a man of higher descent and education like him, before finally giving in. Her father, although understanding of Oseki's suffering, states that it is a woman's duty to bear with her husband, also reminding her what Isamu does for the family, Inosuke in particular, and that a divorce would mean Oseki losing her son Taro. Oseki agrees with her father and announces to go back to Isamu, considering herself "dead" and a "spirit" who watches over Taro. Upon entering a rickshaw to take her home, she hears her father crying inside the house.

Still far from their destination, the rickshaw man suddenly stops, insisting that he doesn't want to go any further. Oseki begs him to take her at least to Hirokōji where she can find another rickshaw. At this moment, she and the driver recognise each other – he is Roku Kōsaka, a close friend from childhood days. He apologises for his shabby appearance, telling her how he turned to an irresponsible lifestyle after her wedding, was himself talked by his mother into an unhappy marriage which didn't last, and is now living in a cheap inn. While walking ahead with Roku, Oseki silently reminiscences how he had been in love with her, and how she herself had fantasies of becoming his wife and working in his family's store, before her parents pressured her into the marriage with Isamu. In Hirokōji, they part ways, each returning to their own sad lives.

Publication history
The Thirteenth Night first appeared in the December 1895 edition of Bungei kurabu magazine, a special issue devoted to female writers, which also contained a reprint of Higuchi's story Yamiyo. It received thoroughly positive reviews for its language and polished style.

Translations
The Thirteenth Night was translated into English in 1960–61 by Hisako Tanaka and again in 1981 by Robert Lyons Danly.

Adaptations

Notes

References

Bibliography

1895 short stories
Japanese short stories
Japanese short stories adapted into films
Works by Japanese writers
Literature by women
Meiji period in fiction